Taff Branch is a stream in southern Crawford County in the U.S. state of Missouri. It is a tributary of the Meramec River.

Taff Branch has the name of the local Taff family.

See also
List of rivers of Missouri

References

Rivers of Crawford County, Missouri
Rivers of Missouri